Boiorix was a king of the Cimbri tribe during the Cimbrian War. His most notable achievement was the victory against the Romans at the Battle of Arausio in 105 BC. He was later defeated and slain along with Lugius at the Battle of Vercellae in 101 BC. The other Cimbrian chiefs Claodicus and Caesorix were captured.

References

101 BC deaths
Cimbrian people
Military personnel killed in action
People of the Cimbrian War
Pre-Roman Iron Age
Year of birth unknown
2nd-century BC monarchs